Eagle Feather may refer to:
 The feather of an eagle.
 Eagle feather law in the United States.
 A short story by Habib Ahmadzadeh about the civilian resistance against the Iraqi siege of the southern Iranian city of Abadan during the Iran–Iraq War (1980–88).
 Eagle Feather, a football player.